The Grand prix de l'urbanisme is awarded for urban planning in France by the Ministry for Ecology, Energy, Sustainable Development and Planning. The prize has been awarded annually since 1989, except during the period from 1994 until 1998, when it was not awarded.

A book is published each year, detailing the work of the award winner and other nominees.

Prize winners

References

External links
 Grand prix de l'urbanisme  

Architecture awards
French awards
Urban planning in France